Frances FitzGerald may refer to:

 Frances FitzGerald (journalist) (born 1940), American journalist, wrote about Vietnam
 Frances Fitzgerald (politician) (born 1950), Irish politician
 Frances Scott Fitzgerald (1921–1986), daughter of Scott and Zelda Fitzgerald, journalist

See also
 Francis Fitzgerald (disambiguation)
 Franky Fitzgerald, Francesca, Skins character
 Frankie Fitzgerald (born 1985), British actor
 Frank Fitzgerald (disambiguation)